Qiaohe station is a station on the Taipei Metro's Circular line. The station was opened on 31 January 2020. It is located in Zhonghe District, New Taipei, Taiwan.

Station layout

Around the station
 Costco Zhonghe Store (300m southeast of the station)

References

Zhonghe District
2020 establishments in Taiwan
Circular line stations (Taipei Metro)
Railway stations opened in 2020